Sarby Castle or Mittel-Schreibendorf Castle is located in the village Sarby, about 45 km southwest of the city of Wrocław in Lower Silesian Voivodeship, Poland. Before 1945 it belonged to German Silesia. 

The manor house of Mittel Schreibendorf (today Sarby) was owned by the von Gaffron family from 1740 to short after 1900.

References
Karten herausgegeben von der Preußischen Landesaufnahme
Wappen u. Handbuch des in Schlesien landgesessenen Adels, A. v. Krane, Görlitz 1901–1904.

External links

Castles in Lower Silesian Voivodeship